Extinction coefficient refers to several different measures of the absorption of light in a medium:

Attenuation coefficient, sometimes called "extinction coefficient" in meteorology or climatology
Mass extinction coefficient, how strongly a substance absorbs light at a given wavelength, per mass density
Molar extinction coefficient, how strongly a substance absorbs light at a given wavelength, per molar concentration
Optical extinction coefficient, the imaginary part of the complex index of refraction

See also
 For the quantitative relationship between the chemistry and physics definitions, see Mathematical descriptions of opacity

de:Extinktionskoeffizient
fr:Absorptivité molaire